The following is a list of HTML editors.

Source code editors

Source code editors evolved from basic text editors, but include additional tools specifically geared toward handling code.

ActiveState Komodo
Aptana
Arachnophilia
Atom
BBEdit
BlueFish
Coda
Codelobster
CoffeeCup HTML Editor
CudaText
Dreamweaver
Eclipse with the Web Tools Platform
Emacs
EmEditor
Geany
HTML-Kit
HomeSite
Microsoft Visual Studio
Microsoft Visual Studio Code
Notepad++
NetBeans IDE
PHPEdit
 PhpStorm IDE
PSPad
RJ TextEd
SciTE
Smultron
Sublime Text
TED Notepad
TextMate
TextPad
TextWrangler
UltraEdit
Vim
Visual Studio Code
WebStorm

WYSIWYG editors

HTML editors that support What You See Is What You Get (WYSIWYG) paradigm provide a user interface similar to a word processor for creating HTML documents, as an alternative to manual coding. Achieving true WYSIWYG however is not always possible.  

 Adobe Dreamweaver
 Amaya
 BlueGriffon
 Bootstrap Studio
 CKEditor
 EZGenerator
 FirstPage
 Freeway
 Google Web Designer
 HTML-NOTEPAD
 Jimdo
 KompoZer
 Maqetta
 Microsoft Expression Web
 Microsoft SharePoint Designer
 Microsoft Visual Web Developer Express
 Microsoft Publisher
 Mobirise
 NetObjects Fusion
 openElement
 Opera Dragonfly
 Quanta Plus
 RocketCake
 SeaMonkey Composer
 Silex website builder
 SnapEditor
 TinyMCE
 tkWWW
 TOWeb
 UltraEdit
 Webflow
 WebPlus
 Wix.com
 WorldWideWeb

Word processors
While word processors are not ostensibly HTML editors, the following word processors are capable of editing and saving HTML documents. Results will vary when opening some web pages.

AbiWord
Apache OpenOffice
Apple Pages
AppleWorks
Collabora Online
Kingsoft Office
LibreOffice Writer
Microsoft Word
WordPerfect

WYSIWYM editors
WYSIWYM (what you see is what you mean) is an alternative paradigm to WYSIWYG, in which the focus is on the semantic structure of the document rather than on the presentation.  These editors produce more logically structured markup than is typical of WYSIWYG editors, while retaining the advantage in ease of use over hand-coding using a text editor.
 Lyx
 WYMeditor

Discontinued editors
Editors that have been discontinued, but may still be in use or cited on published web pages
 Adobe Brackets
 Adobe GoLive (replaced by Adobe Dreamweaver)
 Adobe Muse
 Adobe PageMill (replaced by Adobe GoLive)
 AOLpress
 Apple iWeb
 Claris Home Page
 HotDog
 HoTMetaL (replaced by XMetaL)
 KompoZer
 Macromedia HomeSite (replaced by Adobe Dreamweaver)
 Microsoft Expression Web
 Microsoft FrontPage (replaced by Microsoft Expression Web and Microsoft SharePoint Designer)
 Microsoft WebMatrix
 Mozilla Composer (replaced by Nvu and SeaMonkey Composer)
 Netscape Composer
 Nvu (replaced by KompoZer and BlueGriffon)
 OpenOffice.Org (replaced by Apache OpenOffice and LibreOffice)

See also
Comparison of HTML editors
Comparison of text editors
Content Management System

References

External links

 
HTML editors